Doug Brightwell (born October 12, 1928) was an American football player who played for the Saskatchewan Roughriders and Edmonton Eskimos in Canada. He played college football at Texas Christian University from 1945-1948. He was drafted by the Pittsburgh Steelers in 1948, for the 1949 season, but instead decided to play professionally in Canada.

References

1928 births
Living people
Edmonton Elks players
People from Rosenberg, Texas
Saskatchewan Roughriders players
TCU Horned Frogs football players